Bay City Independent School District is a 4A public school district based in Bay City, Texas (USA). It is the largest school district in Matagorda county, covering 158 sq mi. BCISD operates five campuses: Bay City High School, Bay City Junior High, Tenie Holmes Elementary, Linnie Roberts Elementary, and John H. Cherry Elementary. The district is 20 miles from Matagorda Beach and the Gulf Coast of Mexico and 70 miles SW of Houston, serving 3,500 students and 550 employees.

In August 2022, the Board of Directors names Dr. Dwight McHazlett as the new Superintendent.

Finances
As of the 2010-2011 school year, the appraised valuation of property in the district was $1,005,148,000. The maintenance tax rate was $0.117 and the bond tax rate was $0.015 per $100 of appraised valuation.

Academic achievement
In 2022, Bay City ISD received a scaled score of 88 and a "B" accountability rating from the TEA. When the score was broken down, they received a "B" in Student Achievement and an "A" in school progress.

Schools
In the 2011-2012 school year, the district had six schools. On March 9, 2011, Superintendent Keith Brown announced a reduction in force in accordance with state and federal budget cuts, with Bay City Intermediate School and McAllister Intermediate School closing effective August 2011.

Regular instructional
Bay City High School: Grades 9th-12th
400 7th Street, Bay City, TX 77414
979-401-1101
Bay City Junior High: Grades 6th-8th
3010 Carey Smith Boulevard, Bay City, TX 77414
979-401-1600
Tenie Holmes Elementary: Grades 3rd-5th
3200 5th Street, Bay City, TX 77414
979-401-1400
Linnie Roberts Elementary: Grades 1st-2nd

 4100 Hiram Brandon Drive, Bay City, TX 77414
 979-401-1500

John H. Cherry Elementary: Grades PreK 4-Kindergarten

 2916 8th Street, Bay City, TX 77414
 979-401-1300

Additional Buildings

H.J. McAllister Administration Building

 520 7th Street, Bay City, TX 77414
 979-401-1005

Transportation Department

 2217 9th Street, Bay City, TX 77414
 979-401-1090

Maintenance, Custodial, & Special Programs

 2801 15th Street, Bay City, TX 77414
 979-401-1081 (Maintenance and Custodial)
 979-401-1040 (Special Programs)

IT Department

 1507 Sycamore Ave, Bay City, TX 77414
 979-401-1050

Mascot, School Colors, and Mottos 
The district mascot is a blackcat and is recognised at the junior high as a "panther." The name of the high school mascot is "Jinx" and is a female blackcat that wears a bow.

The school colors are royal blue (hex #18439f) and gold (hex #e8b828).

Bay City High School and the Athletic Department Motto: Blackcat Fight Never Dies

Bay City Junior High Motto:

Tenie Holmes Elementary: Living the Blackcat Dream

Linnie Roberts: Every Student Grows Everyday

Cherry Elementary Motto: Where the Blackcat Legacy Begins

Closed schools
McAllister Intermediate
Although this school received an accountability rating in 2011, it is no longer listed in the state school directory for the 2011-2012 school year.
Bay City Intermediate
Although this school received an accountability rating in 2011, it is no longer listed in the state school directory for the 2011-2012 school year.

See also

List of school districts in Texas

References

External links
 

School districts in Matagorda County, Texas
School districts established in 1900